{{Infobox organization
| name                = Jim Henson Foundation
| image               = Logo_Jim_Henson_Foundation.gif
| size                = 250px
| formation           = 
| tax_id              = 13-3133702<ref name= irseos>"The Jim Henson Foundation. Tax Exempt Organization Search. Internal Revenue Service. Retrieved February 20, 2021.</ref>
| status              = 501(c)(3) private foundation
| revenue             = $598,926
| revenue_year        = 2019
| expenses            = $391,982
| expenses_year       = 2019
| headquarters        = Long Island City, New York, United States
| leader_title        = President
| leader_name         = Cheryl Henson
| key_people          = 
| website             = 
}}

The Jim Henson Foundation was founded by puppeteer and Muppet creator Jim Henson to promote and develop puppetry in the United States. Since 1992 Jim Henson's daughter Cheryl Henson has served as the president for the Foundation.

It is the only grant-making institution with the mission of supporting puppetry. The Jim Henson Foundation has given over 1000 grants to date totaling over $4.2million in grants, of which over $2.8million was awarded directly to puppet artists.  Past grant recipients include MacArthur Fellow Julie Taymor, director of the Broadway musical The Lion King; Roman Paska, whose dramatic interpretation of Strindberg's The Ghost Sonata was a hit at the 1994 Henson Festival; Ralph Lee, whose production A Popol Vuh Story was also presented at the 1994 Henson Festival and went on to tour New York City public schools; MacArthur Fellow Lee Breuer's company Mabou Mines, whose production Peter & Wendy'' was featured at the 1996 Spoleto Festival and the 1996 Henson Festival, followed by a month-long run at New York's New Victory Theater; Rome Prize recipient Dan Hurlin, Doris Duke Award recipient Janie Geiser, and MacArthur Fellow and Doris Duke Performing Artist Award Basil Twist, whose production Symphonie Fantastique had an acclaimed year-long run in New York.

The Foundation awards Artist Grants in three categories: Production ($7,000), Workshop ($3,000) and Family ($4,000).  In 2015 the Jim Henson Foundation Residency at the Eugene O'Neill Theater Center was established.  In 2017 the Allelu Award for International presentations was created in honor of past board Foundation board member and UNIMA-USA Secretary Allelu Kurten.

The Jim Henson Foundation compiles listings of puppet theater performances, workshops, festivals and exhibits occurring in New York City, around the United States and internationally and shares them through a weekly Friday email list called Puppet Happenings and on the Foundation's website listings of the same name at PuppetHappenings.org.

Notable people 
 

Emily DeCola, New York City based puppet performer and designer.

References

External links
 Official site
 Official Puppet Happenings site

Foundations based in the United States
The Jim Henson Company subsidiaries